La Estancia de gaucho Cruz is a 1938 Argentine comedy film directed by Leopoldo Torres Rios. The film premiered in Buenos Aires.

External links

1938 films
1930s Spanish-language films
Argentine black-and-white films
Films directed by Leopoldo Torres Ríos
1938 comedy films
Argentine comedy films
1930s Argentine films